The Estonian Top Division 1943 was the 22nd football league season in Estonia. First round started on 1 May and ended on 27 June. Second round started on 8 August and ended on 24 October. JS Estonia Tallinn won the title.

League table

Results

References

Estonian Football Championship
Football